Drumbeg is a small village, townland (of 376 acres) and civil parish on the south bank of the River Lagan in County Down, Northern Ireland. The village is covered by the Lisburn City Council area and forms part of the suburban fringe of Belfast.

2001 Census
Drumbeg is classified as a small village or hamlet by the NI Statistics and Research Agency (NISRA) (i.e. with population between 500 and 1,000). On Census day (29 April 2001) there were 727 people living in Drumbeg. Of these:
18.4% were aged under 16 years and 23.8% were aged 60 and over
45.3% of the population were male and 54.8% were female
12.7% were from a Catholic background and 83.2% were from a Protestant background
0.9% of people aged 16–74 were unemployed
For more details see: NI Neighbourhood Information Service

Civil parish of Drumbeg
The civil parish covers areas in the historic baronies of Castlereagh Upper in County Down and Belfast Upper in County Antrim. It also contains the urban area of Dunmurry.

Townlands
The civil parish contains the following townlands:

Ballyaghlis
Ballyfinaghy
Ballygowan
Drumbeg
Dunmurry
Hillhall
Oldforge

See also
List of civil parishes of County Down
List of townlands in County Down
Neill, M. (1995?) Ecclesia De Drum Recollections of the Parish of Drumbeg Diocese of Down. The University Press
Costeclade, C. and Walker, B. (Consultant editors)2013. The Church of Ireland.

References

Villages in County Down
Townlands of County Down